Spine or spinal may refer to:

Science

Biology
 Vertebral column, also known as the backbone
 Dendritic spine, a small membranous protrusion from a neuron's dendrite
 Thorns, spine, and prickles, needle-like structures in plants
 Spine (zoology), needle-like structures in animals
 SPINE (molecular biology) (strep–protein interaction experiment), a method for the detection of protein interactions

Medicine
 Spinal anaesthesia or "a spinal", an injection generally through a fine needle, usually long
 The Spine, a set of national service within the UK NHS Connecting for Health

Arts, entertainment and media
 The Spine (album), a 2004 They Might Be Giants album, including the songs "Spine" and "Spines"
 Spine (1986 film), American film
 The Spine (film), a 2009 animated short by Chris Landreth
 The Spine, a novel by Ladislav Bublík

Fictional entities
 Spinal (Killer Instinct), a fictional character from the video game Killer Instinct
 Spine, a demon in Blood Beast (2007) book of the Demonata saga
 The Spine, the fictional mountain chain which follows the west coast in The Inheritance Cycle
 The Spine, a singing automaton in the band Steam Powered Giraffe, portrayed by David Michael Bennett

Periodicals
 Spine (journal), a bi-weekly peer-reviewed journal of spine surgery, publish by Lippincott
 The Spine Journal, bi-monthly peer-reviewed journal, published by Elsevier

Other uses
 Spine (bookbinding), the closed edge of a book along which the pages are bound
 Spine, a measure of stiffness of an arrow shaft in archery
 SPINE (software), a web content management system

See also
 Anterior inferior iliac spine (AIIS), anterior superior iliac spine (ASIS), posterior inferior iliac spine, and posterior superior iliac spine
 Ischial spine, part of the posterior border of the body of the ischium bone of the pelvi
 Mental spine, on the mandible
 Anterior nasal spine, a bony projection in the skull
 Posterior nasal spine, for the attachment of the musculus uvulae
 Spine of scapula, a prominent plate of bone
 Spine of sphenoid bone (spina angulari) and ethmoidal spine